Glenella is a mixed-use town and suburb of Mackay in the Mackay Region, Queensland, Australia.

Geography 

The land in the east and south-east of the suburb is residential. There is a small industrial estate in the south-east. The remainder of the suburb remains rural, mostly growing sugarcane and some grazing on native vegetation.

The Bruce Highway passes through the suburb from the east (Mount Pleasant) to the west (Farleigh). The North Coast railway line enters the suburb from the north-east (Richmond) and exits to the west (Farleigh). There is a network of cane tramways through the suburb operated by Mackay Sugar to deliver the harvested sugarcane to the sugar mills, the nearest being Farleigh mill in Farleigh.

History 
Mackay North State School opened on 3 February 1879 with an initial enrolment of 35 children. The first teacher was Daniel Shea. It was renamed Glenella State School on 1 April 1912. The school was so badly damaged in the 1918 Mackay cyclone that it was completely rebuilt. (It should not be confused with the current Mackay North State School in North Mackay which opened in 1915).

Glenella Hall opened on Saturday 8 October 1938 with a dance to raise funds for the Mackay Ambulance. Over 300 people attended. The owner of the hall was Ted Jackson and it was located next door to his Glenalla Hotel on the corner of Hill End Road and Davey Street. The hotel was demolished in circa 1980.

Education 
Glenella State School is a government primary (Prep-6) school for boys and girls at 35-55 Hill End Road. In 2018, the school had an enrolment of 189 students with 15 teachers (12 full-time equivalent) and 11 non-teaching staff (7 full-time equivalent). It includes a special education program.

There is no secondary school in Glenella. The nearest secondary schools are Mackay North State High School in North Mackay to the south-east and Pioneer State High School in Andergrove to the north-east.

Amenities
Glenella Community Hall is at 15 Hill End Road. It is operated by the Mackay Regional Council.

References

Suburbs of Mackay, Queensland
Towns in Queensland